Lin Wen-lang (born 12 March 1945) is a Taiwanese politician.

Lin served four terms on the Taipei City Council and was subsequently elected to the Legislative Yuan twice as via party list proportional representation in 1995 and 1998. Lin took office in 2002 and 2006 as an alternate member of the legislature.

In November 2008, Lin was questioned by the Taichung District Prosecutors' Office about a case of market manipulation.

References

1945 births
Living people
Members of the 3rd Legislative Yuan
Members of the 4th Legislative Yuan
Members of the 5th Legislative Yuan
Members of the 6th Legislative Yuan
Democratic Progressive Party Members of the Legislative Yuan
Party List Members of the Legislative Yuan
Taipei City Councilors